Big Blue Bus (stylized in lowercase) is a municipal bus service serving the city of Santa Monica and the greater Westside region of Los Angeles County. The service, operated by the city of Santa Monica, was founded on April 14, 1928 and throughout its existence has used a blue color scheme for its buses, leading to the Big Blue Bus nickname that would later become the official name of the agency. Big Blue Bus receives funding from the Los Angeles County Metropolitan Transportation Authority (Metro) and offers connections to its Metro Bus and Metro Rail systems, but is operated independent from Metro.

History 
The agency was founded on April 14, 1928 as the Santa Monica Municipal Bus Lines and the agency picked a unique blue color scheme for its buses, later leading to the Big Blue Bus nickname. It holds the distinction of being the second oldest public transit bus system still operating in Los Angeles County; only the neighboring Culver CityBus (founded March 4, 1928) is older.

Santa Monica established the bus line in response to a fare increase on the Pacific Electric interurban trains between Santa Monica and Los Angeles.

While independent from other agencies in the Los Angeles area, the Big Blue Bus has always offered connections to the other systems, most notably near the intersections of Pico and Rimpau Boulevards in the Mid-City section of Los Angeles. The historic transfer point was established by Santa Monica, the Los Angeles Railway and Pacific Electric Railway and is known today as the Pico/Rimpau Transit Center and is used the Big Blue Bus and Metro Bus.

In 1978, Santa Monica became the first transit operator in California to operate a bus with a wheelchair lift, the Grumman-Flxible Model 870. It was the third agency to order the bus after Atlanta's MARTA, and Connecticut's CT Transit. The Big Blue Bus was one of the last transit agencies using the iconic GMC New Look "fishbowl" bus, the last of which was retired in 2005.

The Big Blue Bus has been honored with the American Public Transportation Association’s Outstanding Transportation System award in 1987, 1992, 1997, 2000 and 2011.

Routes 
Big Blue Bus operates 19 bus lines: 14 local routes, four Rapid routes and one express route.

Fleet

Current

Incidents 
On November 20, 2012, a Big Blue Bus turned left in front of an oncoming motorcyclist, which resulted in the 25-year-old man's death. The accident occurred at approximately 10:33 a.m. at the triangular intersection of Sunset Boulevard and Marquez in the Pacific Palisades. Only buses are allowed to make the left turn, a maneuver that has been determined to be too dangerous for other vehicles.

On June 7, 2013, Bus 4057 of Big Blue Bus was among several vehicles fired at during a thirteen-minute killing spree that left six people dead, including the gunman, and four others wounded. Three women suffered minor injuries aboard the bus, one from shrapnel-type injuries and the other two from injuries unrelated to the gunfire. Approximately two dozen people were inside the bus at the time of the shooting. The attack on Bus 4057 marked the first time a Big Blue Bus came under attack by a gunman in its 85-year service.

In popular culture

Speed 

Two humorous slogans Santa Monica Bank used on Big Blue Buses appeared in the film Speed. The bus operator in the movie is called the Santa Monica Intercity Bus Lines, a fictionalized version of the Big Blue Bus's official name, the Santa Monica Municipal Bus Lines.

Raymond Chandler 
In Raymond Chandler's novel Farewell, My Lovely, first published in 1940, he writes as protagonist Philip Marlowe, describing a scene in Bay City (Chandler's version of the City of Santa Monica):
"Outside the narrow street fumed, the sidewalks swarmed with fat stomachs. Across the street a bingo parlor was going full blast and beside it a couple of sailors with girls were coming out of a photographer's shop where they had probably been having their photos taken riding on camels. The voice of the hot dog merchant split the dusk like an axe. A big blue bus blared down the street to the little circle where the street car used to turn on a turntable. I walked that way."

Curb Your Enthusiasm 
In the Curb Your Enthusiasm episode ”Namaste" (season 9, episode 7), Larry David is forced to catch a bus, an activity he is not accustomed to. The eandevor ends with Larry being kicked off the bus.
The bus station is the Montana/San-Vincente station in Brentwood which serves lines 14 and 18.

The Doors
The lyric from The Doors song “The End” “The blue bus is calling us” is sometimes said to refer to the Big Blue Buses but according Ray Manzarek this is apocryphal.

References

Further reading 
Ayer, Bob. History of Santa Monica's Big Blue Bus. Santa Monica, CA: City of Santa Monica, 1992.

External links 

 
 Google Map of Routes (last updated 2007)

Bus transportation in California
Transportation in Santa Monica, California
Public transportation in Los Angeles
Public transportation in Los Angeles County, California
Transit authorities with natural gas buses
Transit authorities with alternative-fuel vehicles
Bus rapid transit in California